Chambers County is a county in the U.S. state of Texas. As of the 2020 census, its population was 46,571. The county seat is Anahuac.

Chambers County is one of the nine counties that comprise Greater Houston, the  Houston–The Woodlands–Sugar Land metropolitan statistical area.

History
Mission Nuestra Señora de la Luz, a Spanish mission in Texas, was established in 1756 near what is now Wallisville.

Chambers County was founded in 1858. It is named for Thomas Jefferson Chambers, a major general in the Texas Revolution.

In 2019, Atlas Air Flight 3591, a cargo flight operating for Amazon Air, crashed in the Trinity Bay, in Chambers County and near Anahuac, while flying from Miami to Houston. All three people on board were killed.

Geography

The south and southwestern parts of the county lie in the Galveston Bay Area on the shores of Trinity Bay and East Bay. A small portion of the southeastern area lies on the coast of the Gulf of Mexico.

Adjacent counties
 Liberty County (north)
 Jefferson County (east)
 Galveston County (southwest)
 Harris County (west)

National protected areas
 Anahuac National Wildlife Refuge
 Moody National Wildlife Refuge

State and local protected areas 
 Candy Cain Abshier Wildlife Management Area
 Turtle Bayou Nature Preserve

Communities

Cities 

 Anahuac (county seat)
 Baytown (mostly in Harris County)
 Beach City
 Cove
 Mont Belvieu (small part in Liberty County)
 Old River-Winfree (small part in Liberty County)

Census-designated places
 Oak Island
 Stowell
 Winnie

Unincorporated communities

 Double Bayou
 Hankamer
 Monroe City
 Seabreeze
 Smith Point
 Turtle Bayou
 Wallisville

Demographics

Note: the U.S. Census Bureau treats Hispanic/Latino as an ethnic category. This table excludes Latinos from the racial categories and assigns them to a separate category. Hispanics/Latinos can be of any race.

As of the census of 2000,  26,031 people, 9,139 households, and 7,219 families were residing in the county.  The population density was 43 people per sq mi (17/km2).  The 10,336 housing units averaged 17 per sq mi (7/km2).  The racial makeup of the county was 81.88% White, 9.77% African American, 0.48% Native American, 0.67% Asian, 6.02% from other races, and 1.18% from two or more races.  About 10.79% of the population were Hispanics or Latinos of any race.

Of the 9,139 households, 40.60% had children under the age of 18 living with them, 65.70% were married couples living together, 9.00% had a female householder with no husband present, and 21.00% were not families. About 17.80% of all households were made up of individuals, and 6.70% had someone living alone who was 65 years of age or older.  The average household size was 2.82, and the average family size was 3.20.

In the county, the age distribution was 28.90% under 18, 8.20% from 18 to 24, 29.90% from 25 to 44, 24.00% from 45 to 64, and 9.00% who were 65 or older.  The median age was 35 years. For every 100 females, there were 100.60 males.  For every 100 females age 18 and over, there were 99.80 males.

The median income for a household in the county was $47,964, and for a family was $52,986. Males had a median income of $43,351 versus $25,478 for females. The per capita income for the county was $19,863.  About 8.30% of families and 11.00% of the population were below the poverty line, including 13.30% of those under age 18 and 12.60% of those age 65 or over.

Government 
Chambers County is governed by a five-member commissioners' court, consisting of the county judge and four county commissioners. The county judge is elected to four-year terms in a countywide election. Commissioners are elected to four-year terms from single-member districts.

Chambers County Commissioners' Court

Elected Officials

Constables

United States Congress

Texas Legislature

Texas Senate

Texas House of Representatives

State Board of Education

Courts

Justices of the Peace

District Courts

1st Court of Appeals

14th Court of Appeals

Politics
As with much of the Southern United States, Democrats won locally up into the 21st century, with many local politicians switching party allegiances in the mid 2000s. As of 2020 all elected county offices are represented by Republicans with the retirement of the Precinct 5 Constable Cecil. R. "Popeye" Oldham, a Democrat, who was last elected in 2016.

Education
 Public School Districts
Local Primary and Secondary School Jurisdictions. Each are governed by their own respective school board.
 Goose Creek CISD
 Barbers Hill ISD
 Anahuac ISD
 East Chambers ISD
 La Porte ISD (parts of uninhabited Galveston Bay)

 Higher Education
Community Colleges
 Lee College (for most all of Chambers County)
 San Jacinto College (parts of uninhabited Galveston Bay)

 Public libraries
The Chambers County Library System operates three libraries in the county.
 Chambers County Library (main branch) in Anahuac
 Juanita Hargraves Memorial Branch in Winnie
 Sam and Carmena Goss Memorial Branch in Mont Belvieu

Transportation

Major highways
  Interstate 10
  State Highway 61
  State Highway 65
  State Highway 99 (Grand Parkway)
  State Highway 146

Airports
The county operates two airports in unincorporated areas:
 Chambers County Airport is east of Anahuac.
 Chambers County-Winnie Stowell Airport serves Stowell and Winnie.

In addition, RWJ Airpark, a privately owned airport for public use, is located in Beach City.

The Houston Airport System stated that Chambers County is within the primary service area of George Bush Intercontinental Airport, an international airport in Houston in Harris County.

See also 

 List of museums in the Texas Gulf Coast
 National Register of Historic Places listings in Chambers County, Texas
 Recorded Texas Historic Landmarks in Chambers County

References

External links

 Chambers County government's website
 Chambers County in Handbook of Texas Online from The University of Texas at Austin
 Chambers County, TXGenWeb Focuses on genealogical research in Chambers County.

 
1858 establishments in Texas
Populated places established in 1858
Greater Houston